Yuriy Reznikov (born 16 October 1953, died 8 October 2016) was a Ukrainian physicist, Head of the Department of Crystals at NASU Institute of Physics and a world-renown expert in the field of liquid crystals. He is known for his work on photoalignment, "giant" optical non-linearity of liquid crystals and nano-colloids.

Education and career 
Yuriy Reznikov received his Master's degree in radiophysics from Taras Shevchenko National University of Kyiv in 1976. In 1985, he received his doctorate in physics in NASU Institute of Physics. His Ph.D. thesis was titled “The study of the optical nonlinearity of liquid crystals near their electron absorption bands”. In 1995, Yuriy has received his Doctor of Sciences degree after defending the thesis titled “Light Induced Impurities in Liquid Crystals”. Since 1995, he was a head of the Department of Crystals in NASU Institute of Physics.

Research 
During 1979-1984 Yuriy Reznikov has discovered and studied “Giant” optical nonlinearity of liquid crystals caused by photo-transformation of their molecules (so called “conformational nonlinearity”). Prof. Francesco Simoni of Università Politecnica delle Marche (Ancona, Italy) wrote in his condolence for the death of Yuriy: “This nonlinearity is considered as a milestone for researches that followed and had many consequences as the ones related to effects of photo-isomerization on the liquid crystalline state carried out by several groups over the world and leading to the exciting research of photomobile materials”. The conformational nonlinearity then was applied for optical information processing and hologram recording. 

After finishing the PhD thesis Yuriy has developed a method to measure the liquid crystal anchoring energy using light scattering technique. In the 1985-89 he has also studied the effect of a light-induced change of a cholesteric pitch under molecular photo-transformations. 

Later on in 1989-1995 Yuriy’s significant accomplishments include the development of the photoalignment technology and control of the liquid crystal anchoring parameters by photoalignment technique. His groundbreaking work has paved the way for the development of this technology all the way to the widespread use in the LCD manufacturing since 2010. Other Yuriy's achievements in this time frame include conformational optical nonlinearity in two-phase region of liquid crystals, surface-driven reorientation effects in liquid crystal cells with photosensitive aligning layer. 

Since 1995, Yuriy’s main milestones include light manipulation of nanoparticles in arrays of topological defects, developing a technique to measure ultra-large cholesteric pitch, studying orientational coupling in two-component suspensions of rod-like nanoparticles, discovering strong thermal optical nonlinearity in liquid crystalline metal nano-colloids, developing stable liquid crystal ferromagnetic nano-colloids, observation of high magnetic sensitivity of the aggregated ferromagnetic nano-colloids, surface mediated photorefraction in liquid crystals, developing rollable bistable plastic liquid crystal displays, studying diluted liquid crystal ferroelectric nano-colloids, finding surface bistability in liquid crystals sandwiched between photo-aligning surfaces.

Selected publications 

 Odulov, S. G., Reznikov, Y. A., Soskin, M. S., & Khizhnyak, A. I. (1984). Photostimulated change of phase-transition temperature and “giant” optical nonlinearity of liquid crystals. In Opticals Effects in Liquid Crystals (pp. 224-228). Springer, Dordrecht. doi: 10.1007/978-94-011-3180-3_29
Vinvogradov, V., A. Khizhnyak, L. Kutulya, Yu Reznikov, and V. Reshetnyak. "Photoinduced change of cholesteric LC-pitch." Molecular crystals and liquid crystals incorporating nonlinear optics 192, no. 1 (1990): 273-278. doi: 10.1080/00268949008035640
 Dyadyusha, A. G., Marusii, T. Y., Reshetnyak, V. Y., Reznikov, Y. A., & Khizhnyak, A. I. (1992). Orientational effect due to a change in the anisotropy of the interaction between a liquid crystal and a bounding surface. JETP lett, 56(1), 17-21.
 Voloshchenko, D., Khyzhnyak, A., Reznikov, Y., & Reshetnyak, V. (1995). Control of an easy-axis on nematic-polymer interface by light action to nematic bulk. Japanese journal of applied physics, 34(2R), 566.
 Glushchenko, A., Kresse, H., Reshetnyak, V., Reznikov, Y., & Yaroshchuk, O. (1997). Memory effect in filled nematic liquid crystals. Liquid crystals, 23(2), 241-246. doi: 10.1080/026782997208505
 Simoni, F., Francescangeli, O., Reznikov, Y., & Slussarenko, S. (1997). Dye-doped liquid crystals as high-resolution recording media. Optics letters, 22(8), 549-551. doi: 10.1364/OL.22.000937
Francescangeli, O., Slussarenko, S., Simoni, F., Andrienko, D., Reshetnyak, V., & Reznikov, Y. (1999). Light-induced surface sliding of the nematic director in liquid crystals. Physical review letters, 82(9), 1855. doi: 10.1103/PhysRevLett.82.1855
 Zhang, J., Ostroverkhov, V., Singer, K. D., Reshetnyak, V., & Reznikov, Y. (2000). Electrically controlled surface diffraction gratings in nematic liquid crystals. Optics letters, 25(6), 414-416. doi: 10.1364/ol.25.000414.
Ouskova, E., Yu Reznikov, S. V. Shiyanovskii, L. Su, John L. West, O. V. Kuksenok, O. Francescangeli, and F. Simoni. "Photo-orientation of liquid crystals due to light-induced desorption and adsorption of dye molecules on an aligning surface." Physical Review E 64, no. 5 (2001): 051709. doi: 10.1103/PhysRevE.64.051709
Fedorenko, Denis, Elena Ouskova, Victor Reshetnyak, and Yuriy Reznikov. "Evolution of light-induced anchoring in dye-doped nematics: Experiment and model." Physical Review E 73, no. 3 (2006): 031701. doi: 10.1103/PhysRevE.73.031701
 Ouskova, E., Buchnev, O., Reshetnyak, V., Reznikov, Y., & Kresse, H. (2003). Dielectric relaxation spectroscopy of a nematic liquid crystal doped with ferroelectric Sn 2 P 2 S 6 nanoparticles. Liquid Crystals, 30(10), 1235-1239.10.1080/02678290310001601996
 Reznikov, Y., Buchnev, O., Tereshchenko, O., Reshetnyak, V., Glushchenko, A., & West, J. (2003). Ferroelectric nematic suspension. Applied Physics Letters, 82(12), 1917-1919. doi: 10.1063/1.1560871
Buluy, Oleksandr, et al. "Magnetic sensitivity of a dispersion of aggregated ferromagnetic carbon nanotubes in liquid crystals." Soft Matter 7.2 (2011): 644-649. doi: 10.1039/C0SM00131G
 Yaroshchuk, Oleg, and Yuriy Reznikov. "Photoalignment of liquid crystals: basics and current trends." Journal of Materials Chemistry 22.2 (2012): 286-300. doi: 10.1039/C1JM13485J
Kasyanyuk, D., P. Pagliusi, A. Mazzulla, V. Reshetnyak, Yu Reznikov, C. Provenzano, M. Giocondo, M. Vasnetsov, O. Yaroshchuk, and G. Cipparrone. "Light manipulation of nanoparticles in arrays of topological defects." Scientific reports 6, no. 1 (2016): 1-7. doi: 10.1038/srep20742
 Reznikov, Yuriy, Anatoliy Glushchenko, and Yuriy Garbovskiy. "Ferromagnetic and ferroelectric nanoparticles in liquid crystals." Liquid crystals with nano and microparticles. 2017. 657-693. doi: 10.1142/9789814619264_0019
Complete list of publications is available at Google Scholar

Awards 

 Freedericksz medal (Liquid Crystal Society "Commonwealth"), 2010
 A. F. Prikhot’ko award (National Academy of Sciences of Ukraine), 2012

References 

Liquid crystals
20th-century Ukrainian physicists

1953 births
2016 deaths
21st-century Ukrainian physicists